Galeta Island may refer to:
 Galeta Island (Panama)
 Galeta Island (Algeria), in the Mediterranean Sea